Locronan is a commune in the Finistère department of Brittany in north-western France, with a population of 800.

Locronan is a member of the Les Plus Beaux Villages de France ("The most beautiful villages of France") association.

Toponymy
The village's name means the "hermitage of Ronan", from the Breton lok ("hermitage") of Saint Ronan. It was previously known as Saint-René-du-Bois.

Saint Ronan, greatly venerated in Brittany, was a 6th-century Irish Christian missionary who came to the region to teach the people. As his association with Locronan is close, some of his relics are kept in the parish church.

History

Locronan is a small town built at the foot of a hill. It was granted town status in 1505 by Anne of Brittany, who went there on a pilgrimage.

Since the 15th century, hemp has naturally grown in the area (see Hemp in France). It was cultivated and processed in a hemp industry in the town at the time, and it was widely used. The town was quite prosperous. Its hemp was exported internationally, as it was used for rigging the ships, both commercial and military, that operated from Brittany's many ports. The Saint Ronan church was built in this period, as well as the small chapel of Penity.

Population
Inhabitants of Locronan are called in French Locronanais.

Breton language
The municipality launched a  plan through Ya d'ar brezhoneg on 23 November 2007 to revive the Breton language.

Events
Troménie is a pilgrimage festival that includes a large procession, whose participants carry the banners of participating parishes.

Held every six years between the second and third Sundays in July, the Grande Troménie is a pilgrimage of about 12 km, traversing the wider sacred area around Locronan. In the intervening five years, the Petite Troménie is held on the second Sunday in July. It is based in the town and church of Locronan. These are among the major pardons or ceremonies of the traditional Breton festal calendar.

Popular culture
Locronan has been used as a setting in films:
Tess (1979), directed by Roman Polanski
A Very Long Engagement, directed  by Jean-Pierre Jeunet
Chouans!, directed by Philippe de Broca

Gallery

See also
Communes of the Finistère department
List of works of the two Folgoët ateliers
Locranon Parish close

References

External links

 Official site
 Official site of the Office de Tourisme
 Gallery of Images on Treakearth
 

Communes of Finistère
Plus Beaux Villages de France